Philodes is a genus of ground beetles in the family Carabidae. There are at least four described species in Philodes.

Species
These four species belong to the genus Philodes:
 Philodes alternans (LeConte, 1853)
 Philodes flavilimbus (LeConte, 1869)
 Philodes longulus (Dejean, 1829)
 Philodes rectangulus (Chaudoir, 1868)

References

Further reading

 

Harpalinae
Articles created by Qbugbot